Mallota is a widely distributed Holarctic genus of hoverfly (a member of the fly family Syrphidae), well known for their bee-like appearance.

Species
Mallota abdominalis Sack, 1927
Mallota aenigma Bezzi, 1912 
Mallota albipilis  Snow, 1895 
M. albipes Snow, 1895
M. bautias (Walker, 1849)
M. bequaerti Hull, 1956
Mallota bicolor Sack, 1910
M. cimbiciformis (Fallén, 1817)
Mallota cingulata Sack, 1927
 Mallota curvigaster (Macquart, 1842)   
M. dasyops (Wiedemann, 1819)
M. dusmeti Andreu, 1925
M. extrema (Loew, 1858)
M. fuciformis (Fabricius, 1794)
M. hirsuta Hull, 1941
Mallota illinoensis Robertson, 1901 
 Mallota inopinata Violovich, 1975 
Mallota inopinata Violovich, 1975  
M. megilliformis (Fallén, 1817)
M. meromacrimima Hull, 1941
 Mallota mississipensis Hull, 1946 
 Mallota munda Violovich, 1955 
 Mallota orientalis Wiedemann, 1824 
M. posticata (Fabricius, 1805)
 Mallota rossica Portschinsky, 1877 
 Mallota rubripes  Matsumura, 1916
M. sackeni Williston, 1882
 Mallota shatalkini Mutin, 1999 
 Mallota spinosa Hirooka & Maruyama, 2015 
 Mallota thompsoni Hirooka & Maruyama, 2015 
M. tricolor Loew, 1871
 Mallota vilis Wiedemann, 1830 ("Non-European Two-Winged Insects as a Continuation of Meigen's Work.  Second Part.") 
 Mallota viridiflavescentis Huo & Ren, 2006

References

 Stubbs, Alan E. and Steven J. Falk (1983), British Hoverflies, an illustrated identification guide, British Entomological and Natural History Society. 

Diptera of Europe
Hoverfly genera
Eristalinae
Taxa named by Johann Wilhelm Meigen